The 1959 Arizona State–Flagstaff Lumberjacks football team was an American football team that represented Arizona State College at Flagstaff (now known as Northern Arizona University) in the Frontier Conference during the 1959 NAIA football season. In their fourth year under head coach Max Spilsbury, the Lumberjacks compiled a 6–2–1 record, won the Frontier Conference championship, and were outscored by a total of 142 to 135.

The team played its home games at Lumberjack Stadium in Flagstaff, Arizona.

Schedule

References

Arizona State-Flagstaff
Northern Arizona Lumberjacks football seasons
Arizona State-Flagstaff Lumberjacks football